Hurt is an English surname. Notable people with the surname include:

People
 Byron Hurt (born 1969), American film director
 Charles Hurt (born 1971), American columnist
 Dwan Hurt (1963–2016), American basketball player and coach
 Edward P. Hurt (1900–1989), American football player and coach
 Erik F. Hurt (1890–1952), English philatelist
 Francis Hurt (1803–1861), English politician
 Hallam Hurt, American neonatologist
 Harry Hurt (1927–2009), American motorcycle safety researcher
 Harry Hurt III (born 1951), American journalist and author
 Jakob Hurt (1839–1907), Estonian folklorist, theologian, and linguist
 James Hurt (born 1967), American pianist
 Joel Hurt (1850–1926), American businessman and developer
 John Hurt (1940–2017), English actor
 Louis Bosworth Hurt (1856–1929), English painter
 Marlin Hurt (1905–1946), American actor and musician
 Martin Hurt (born 1984), Estonian footballer
 Mary Beth Hurt (born 1946), American actress
 Maurice Hurt (born 1987), American footballer
 Mississippi John Hurt (John Smith Hurt; 1892–1966), American musician
 Norbert Hurt (born 1985), Estonian football player and manager
 Pete Hurt (born 1956), American football player and coach
 Richard Hurt (died 1616), English politician
 Robert L. Hurt, American physicist
 Robert Hurt (born 1969), American politician
 Tony Hurt (born 1946), New Zealand rower
 Wade Hurt, American soil scientist
 William Hurt (1950–2022), American actor

Fictional characters
 Simon Hurt (Doctor Hurt), character from the DC Comics universe

See also
 Hurter, Swiss noble family

English-language surnames